Rob Dyrdek's Wild Grinders, also known simply as Wild Grinders, is an animated television series created by, produced by, and loosely based on the life of professional skateboarder and reality TV star Rob Dyrdek. It started out as a series of shorts produced by MoonScoop Group in 2009 and aired on Kabillion, which were adapted into a successful toy-line from Mattel that released in 2010.

Following the shorts and merchandise line, a full series of 22-minute episodes was distributed by MoonScoop Entertainment and aired on the Nicktoons channel in 2012. The show made its second broadcast on U.S. television on April 27, 2012. During this time, content featuring the Wild Grinders characters continued to be seen on Kabillion, a video on demand channel and streaming video website partially owned by Moonscoop.

On August 1, 2013, Rob Dyrdek confirmed a second season with 26 episodes, which premiered on Nicktoons on December 23, 2013.

Rob Dyrdek partnered with Teletoon to create a two-parter Halloween special, titled "Texas Skateboard Horrorland Zombie Activity 3", which aired on October 24, 2013, on Teletoon in Canada.

Synopsis
This skateboard themed series features the crazy hijinks and shenanigans of an energetic and thrill-seeking skateboarding pre-teen Lil' Rob (based on the series creator) and his best friends: Meaty, a bulldog with a hip edge (based on Meaty, a dog that the real Rob Dyrdek owns); Goggles, Rob's nerdy but loyal and kind-hearted best friend; and a host of other zany kids from the neighborhood, as well as Lil' Rob's majestic parents and older teenage sister.

Characters

Main
Lil' Rob (voiced by Rob Dyrdek) – Lil' Rob is the titular character and the leader of the Wild Grinders. He is an upbeat pre-adolescent with an adventurous personality, and infinitely never surrenders from his rival, Stubford Hucksterball. His aliases include Kid Voltage in "The Amaaazing Adventures of Captain Grindstar" and Agent Supernova in "Substitute Secret Agent." Rob is the lead singer of the Backside Grinders. His Catchphrases Are “ Wild Grinders!, Amazing! and Whaaaaaat! “
Meaty (voiced by Sterling "Steelo" Brim (season 1), Lee Harrell (season 2)) – Lil' Rob's anthropomorphic British bulldog. He favors eating burritos, bacon, and especially the extinct Stinkies products. He's also known for being the Backside Grinders' drummer, Meat-Borg in "The Amaaazing Adventures of Captain Grindstar" and Agent MeatBag in "Substitute Secret Agent." In the pilot online episodes, Meaty Can’t Talk.
Goggles (voiced by Yuri Lowenthal, credited as Jimmy Benedict) – Lil' Rob's nerdy and loyal friend. He is the cameraman of both the Wild and Backside Grinders and the major inventor, but he can be forgetful of anything that the Grinders want significant. Known as Goggle Lad in "The Amaaazing Adventures of Captain Grindstar" and Agent Whiz Kid in "Substitute Secret Agent." In the pilots, he rarely spoke but when he did, his voice was deeper. He's also the weakest skater out of the team, confirmed in "Swaggerless" and according to Jack Knife.
Emo Crys (voiced by Cam Clarke, Charlie Schlatter in pilot episodes (uncredited)) – The poetic and sensitive of the Wild Grinders. Emo Crys is frequently a skate artist and creates terrible and dark poetry. He sometimes goes "girl-crazy." Known as cowbell player from the Backside Grinders and Emo Scissor Clippers "The Amaaazing Adventures of Captain Grindstar." The pilot episodes showed him that he was Lil' Rob's best friend instead of Goggles.
Jay Jay (voiced by Kel Mitchell) – An intelligent hipster. He was portrayed to have mysophobia. He's the Backside Grinders' keyboard player. In the pilot episodes, Jay Jay in known to be Lil' Rob's friend, instead of Goggles.
Jack Knife (voiced by Yuri Lowenthal) – A dull kid with a big heart. He and his family runs a circus in Sprawl City. He plays electric guitar in the band which he initially used as a saxophone. In the pilots, Jack Knife didn't have his southern accent.
Spitball (voiced by Yuri Lowenthal) – The silent type and dubbed as Street Ninja. He's the Backside bass player. He only spoke Spanish in the pilots. 
Stubford Hucksterball (voiced by Erin Fitzgerald) – The main antagonist of the entire series. He is a child with a short height, but summons his mechanical stalls to make him taller than the Grinders. He frequently aliases Lil' Rob as "Lil' Slob." He made no appearances prior to the show's official debut.
Flipz (voiced by Chanel West Coast) – The only female skater in the Wild Grinders. She tends to challenge Lil' Rob to skate in most of her appearances. Although she joins the Grinders, she was not shown at all times.

Recurring
Denise (voiced by Erin Fitzgerald) – Lil' Rob's older sister who most of the time annoys Lil' Rob and the Grinders. She often calls the Wild Grinders (as well as other skaters) "weenies." She has a crush on a boy named Freddie, although he too is a skater.
Lackey (Yuri Lowenthal) or Officer Lackowski, as he prefers, is Stubford's rent-a-cop sidekick hired by Track to keep Stubford out of his hair. Lackey is very dim-witted. 
Gene (voiced by Rob Dyrdek) – Lil' Rob's father. Lil' Rob always calls Gene by his first name instead of calling him "Dad."
Patty (voiced by Erin Fitzgerald) – Lil' Rob's mother. She does not like the shows she sees (she is repeatedly seen watching a show, then saying "Aww, I hate this show."). She is also secretly a secret agent called Agent Capricorn.
Track Hucksterball (voiced by Cam Clarke) – Stubford's wealthy, money-grubbing and neglectful father who is always trying to exploit or make the Wild Grinders famous. He is also Gene's boss. He is also most of the time never there for his son.
Chip Fligginton (voiced by Kel Mitchell) – A famous web personality who's always there when a star is to be born and often helps take of advantage the situation.
Queen of Moronico (voiced by Kel Mitchell) – She is the queen of the fictional country of Moronico and is very protective of her son and believes in status quos.
Prince of Moronico (voiced by Yuri Lowenthal) – The prince of Moronico who looks exactly like Jack Knife. The only differences between him and Jack Knife are his accent, he has a gold tooth while Jack Knife has a gap and the fact that he does not know how to skate.
Jankins (voiced by Cam Clarke) – The royal butler to the royal family and follows orders from Queen unquestioned and often does things for people instead of allowing to do it like practice skating in the prince's place.
Freddie (voiced by Cam Clarke) – The desire of Denise's affection and also runs the Taco truck. He is also a skater, like Lil' Rob.
Captain Grindstar (voiced by Tracy Tubera) – Goggles' superhero idol.
Agents 1 and Agent 2- Two black ops agents who work for Area 52 they often conspire take over or destroy the world.
Mr. Sprinkles (unknown) is Flips' pet wiener dog and Meaty's rival in pawjitsu. He usually causes trouble when the Grinders least expect it.
Squeak (voiced by Yuri Lowenthal) is a character who debuted in "Emo's Mystery Girl" where he seems to have met the Grinders prior to that episode. According to Jay Jay, Squeak is a poser and a huge liar.

Episodes

Mobile game
In June 2014, it was announced that a Wild Grinders mobile game was being developed for iPhone, iPad and Android by Bubble Gum Interactive. The game was slated to launch in September 2014, but instead was launched on February 11, 2015. The mobile game was titled Wild Grinders Downhill Grind.

Reception
Wild Grinders received generally negative reviews from critics. Emily Ashby of British  gave the series 2 out of 5 stars. In her review, Ashby praised the racial divides and the good messages about friendship, but criticized the stereotypes surrounding skateboarding culture, the name calling and the main character's disrespect towards adults.

References

External links
 
 

2010s American animated television series
2012 American television series debuts
2015 American television series endings
American children's animated comedy television series
American children's animated sports television series
American flash animated television series
English-language television shows
Nicktoons (TV network) original programming
Animated television series about children
Animation based on real people